Pålson is a Swedish-language surname. Notable people with the surname include:

Stefan Printz-Påhlson (born 1950), Swedish cartoonist
 (1882-1959), Swedish military personnel, businessman and art patron, best known for Operation Stella Polaris

Swedish-language surnames